Cydia indivisa is a species of moth of the family Tortricidae. It is found from Fennoscandia to France, Switzerland, Austria and Slovakia. In the east, the range extends to the Baltic region and northern Russia.

The wingspan is 13–16 mm. Adults are on wing from May to July in one generation per year.

The larvae feed on Picea abies. They feed under the bark of their host plant.

References

Moths described in 1963
Grapholitini
Moths of Japan
Moths of Europe